Karimabad-e Ansari (also Romanized as Karīmābād-e Anşārī and Karīmābād Anşārī; also known as Karīmābād) is a village in Fahraj Rural District, in the Central District of Fahraj County, Kerman Province, Iran. At the 2006 census, its population was 562, in 123 families.

References 

Populated places in Fahraj County